This article presents a list of the historical events and publications of Australian literature during 1882.

Books 

 Rolf Boldrewood — Robbery Under Arms
 Ada Cambridge — Across the Grain
 Rosa Praed — Nadine : The Study of a Woman

Poetry 

 Rolf Boldrewood
 "The Bushman's Lullaby"
 "Perdita"
 Victor J. Daley — "The First of May"
 John Farrell — Two Stories : A Fragmentary Poem
 Henry Kendall — "Outre Mer"
 Douglas Sladen — Frithjof and Ingebjorg and Other Poems

Biography 

 Rolf Boldrewood — Old Melbourne Memories

Births 

A list, ordered by date of birth (and, if the date is either unspecified or repeated, ordered alphabetically by surname) of births in 1882 of Australian literary figures, authors of written works or literature-related individuals follows, including year of death.

 18 July — Alice Grant Rosman, poet (died 1961)
 22 July — Frederic Manning, poet (died 1935)
 2 August — Ruth Bedford, poet (died 1963)
 22 September — Annie Rattray Rentoul, children's poet and story writer (died 1978)
 23 September — Brian Vrepont, poet (died 1955)

Deaths 

A list, ordered by date of death (and, if the date is either unspecified or repeated, ordered alphabetically by surname) of deaths in 1882 of Australian literary figures, authors of written works or literature-related individuals follows, including year of birth.

 1 August — Henry Kendall, poet (born 1839)
 2 December — Eliza Winstanley, writer and stage actress (born 1818 in England)

See also 
 1882 in poetry
 List of years in literature
 List of years in Australian literature
 1882 in literature
 1881 in Australian literature
 1882 in Australia
 1883 in Australian literature

References

Literature
Australian literature by year
19th-century Australian literature
1882 in literature